Brooke Elizabeth McLaurin, (born June 13, 1981) is an American beauty pageant titleholder from Eastover, North Carolina who was named Miss North Carolina 2005.

Biography
She won the title of Miss North Carolina on June 25, 2005, when she received her crown from outgoing titleholder Kirstin Elrod. At the age of 22, McLaurin was diagnosed with a brain tumor. After successful surgery to remove the tumor, she changed her platform to brain tumor awareness and research, and was able to raise $10,000 for brain tumor research. McLaurin is a graduate of Fayetteville State University. She accepted a position as a hostess on the Jewelry TV network and relocated to Knoxville, Tennessee in January 2015.

References

External links
 

Miss America 2006 delegates
1981 births
Living people
People from Fayetteville, North Carolina
Fayetteville State University alumni
American beauty pageant winners
Miss North Carolina winners